Poponto Swamp is a swamp in Luzon, Philippines, located at the boundary of Tarlac and Pangasinan provinces. This 25-square kilometer swamp can be found at the confluence of the Agno and Tarlac rivers. It is near the town of Bayambang, Pangasinan. It is also known as the Mangabol Marsh.

References

Wetlands of the Philippines
Landforms of Pangasinan
Landforms of Tarlac
Swamps of Asia